Pschitt!  is a French soda created by Perrier in 1954. The name originates in the transcription in French of the noise made by a Perrier bottle when it is opened. It comes in two flavors: lemon and orange. It is now a product of Roxane.

It is one of the oldest French soft drinks.

References

Citrus sodas
Train-related introductions in 1954